Gus and the Anarchists is a 1915 American silent comedy film featuring Oliver Hardy. The film was produced by the Lubin Manufacturing Company.

Plot 
Gus, a waiter at a cheap cafe falls in love with Rosy, the coffee cashier. To make fun of him, she tells him that if he wants to be with her, he must become an anarchist like her. Colleagues of Rosy attend the joke, pretending all to be the members of the band of fearsome anarchists. In the place where they meet, Gus is told that, to prove loyal, he must commit murder. But before the mission can be completed, some false policemen break into the bar.

Cast
 Oliver Hardy as Tom Dreck (as Babe Hardy)
 C.W. Ritchie as Gus Goober
 Frances Ne Moyer as Rosy Heintz

See also
 List of American films of 1915
 Oliver Hardy filmography

References

External links

1915 films
1915 short films
American silent short films
American black-and-white films
1915 comedy films
Films about anarchism
Silent American comedy films
Lubin Manufacturing Company films
American comedy short films
1910s American films
1910s English-language films